Mallakam is a town in northern Sri Lanka located approximately  north of the city of Jaffna. The town is divided into three Village Officer Divisions (Mallakam Center, Mallakam North and Mallakam South) whose combined population was 6,834 at the 2012 census.

Transport 
 Mallakam railway station

References

Towns in Jaffna District
Valikamam North DS Division